Raphael Tuju, EGH (born 30 March 1959) is a Kenyan politician. In 2002—after a career as a journalist, TV producer, and real estate investor—Tuju was elected to parliament and has served the Government of Kenya in various capacities since that time.

Education
Tuju attended Majiwa Primary School and Nakuru West Primary School and, for his secondary education, Starehe Boys' Centre and School. He holds a Master of Arts (MA) degree in mass communications from the University of Leicester, United Kingdom.

Career

Business
Tuju worked as an anchor for TV news in the late 1980s and early part of the 1990s on a part-time basis. He was a producer and director of several documentaries, radio and TV commercials for international agencies, public sector institutions, and private-sector bodies. He was a columnist for local newspapers notably the East African Standard.

He worked as lead consultant in the design and implementation of several public communication programs for a varied clientele that included the World Health Organization (WHO) in Geneva, the World Bank, the Department for International Development (DFID) of the British government, United States Agency for International Development (USAID), and the United Nations Development Programme (UNDP).

From 1992 to 2001, he was founder director of Ace Communications.

He has interests in the real estate sector.

Of his accomplishments Tuju says,

In my younger years, I worked as a Television Producer with several documentary films to my credit and earning the distinction of being the first TV Producer in Africa to win an International Emmy award for a TV production. I mainly addressed health and human development issues in my communication career with HIV/AIDS and Gender Empowerment being the main subject matter and in which I am credited with some of the major ground breaking mark in Kenya.

Political
In 2002, Tuju was elected as a member of parliament (MP) from Rarieda constituency in the December 2002 parliamentary election a member of parliament (MP) for Rarieda constituency. He served until 2007, in which time he is credited with the building of five (5) new secondary schools to increase high school enrollment in the region. He also implemented a major water project for the Rarieda people and introduced an innovative mobile hospital to decrease infant mortality as a result of malaria and HIV/AIDS.

The National Rainbow Coalition took power in 2003. Between 2003 and 2005, Mr. Tuju held the portfolios of Minister of Information and Communications and Minister for Tourism and Wildlife. By 2005 he had become well known for his feud with then roads minister Raila Odinga. He political career was believed to be in danger, but on 8 December 2005, he became foreign minister in a cabinet reshuffle.

Prior to the 2005 referendum vote in Kenya, Tuju formed the Progressive People's Party (PPP) with a view to swaying votes away from the "orange No campaign". He joined Narc through the LDP. This was seen as an act of betrayal by his Rarieda constituents and by extension the Luo Nyanza populace of which he was a member.

Tuju served as Kenya's Foreign Affairs Minister from end of 2005 to end of 2007.

On 5 August 2007, at the 29th Assilah Cultural Festival in Asillah, Morocco, Tuju derided European governments for policies that inhibited trade with Africa, of ramming punitive policies down the throats of poor African nations. He attacked unjust tariff and non-tariff barriers that would stifle the growth of Africa and widen the resource gap with Europe.

Tuju, running as a candidate of Kibaki's Party of National Unity, lost his seat in the December 2007 parliamentary election. He was replaced as Foreign Minister by Moses Wetangula in the Cabinet named by Kibaki on 8 January 2008.

From 2008 to 2011 Tuju served as Advisor to the President of the Republic of Kenya, on matters related to media and the management of diversity. He also served as Special Envoy of the President on various missions.

In 2012, Tuju launched his new political vehicle for the presidency, the Party of Action (POA). In 2017, he became secretary general of the newly formed Jubilee Party.

In 2018, Tuju was named by President Uhuru Kenyatta as cabinet secretary without portfolio.

Honors
Tuju was awarded the second highest civilian title in Kenya, E.G.H. (Elder of the Golden Heart) by President Mwai Kibaki for his many years of service to the people of Kenya in the area of health, human development and public service.

Personal life
In 1996, Tuju married Ruth Akinyi. They divorced in 2013. He has three children: two daughters and a son.

On 12 February 2020, on the Nairobi–Nakuru highway, Tuju was involved in an auto accident while travelling to Kabarak to attend the burial of the late president of Kenya Daniel arap Moi.

References

External links
 Transcript of Tuju's address of the UN General  Assembly on 26 September 2006
 Citizen TV article
 BBC video
 SDE article on being in cabinet

1959 births
Living people
Alumni of Starehe Boys Centre and School
Alumni of the University of Leicester
Jubilee Party politicians
Members of the National Assembly (Kenya)
National Rainbow Coalition politicians
Party of National Unity (Kenya) politicians
Communication ministers of Kenya
Foreign ministers of Kenya
Tourism ministers of Kenya